Heteromyinae is a subfamily of rodents in the family Heteromyidae, commonly known as spiny pocket mice. It contains a single extant genus, Heteromys, as well as the extinct genera Diprionomys and Metaliomys. Heteromys was recently enlarged by inclusion of the members of formerly recognized heteromyine genus Liomys, which was found to be paraphyletic.

Taxonomy
Heteromyinae is the sister group of Perognathinae; the two are estimated to have split about 22-23 million years (Ma) ago. The most recent common ancestor of extant heteromyines is thought to have lived 12-15 Ma ago; the basal species in the subfamily is H. salvini.

References

Heteromyidae
Taxa named by John Edward Gray
Mammal subfamilies